"Misery" is an 1886 short story by Anton Chekhov.

Publication
The story was first published in Peterburgskaya Gazetas No. 26, 16 January (old style) 1886 issue, signed A. Chekhonte (А. Чехонте). With minor changes it appeared in the Motley Stories (Пёстрые рассказы) collection. In 1895 it made its way into an anthology called Probleski (Проблески, Glimpses, 1895, via the Posrednik Publishers). In a slightly revised version Chekhov included it into Volume 3 of his Collected Works published by Adolf Marks in 1899–1901.

Synopsis
The cabman Iona's son recently died. He desperately and unsuccessfully tries to have a talk with the people he meets and tell them of how shattered he is. He ends up talking to his horse.

Reception
The story was positively reviewed by Peterburgskiye Vedomosti (No.167, 1886) and N. Ladozhsky. Leonid Obolensky, writing for Russkoye Bogatstvo praised Chekhov for his extraordinary ability to see the hidden drama behind deceptively simple things, and cited "Misery" as a perfect example of that. Konstantin Arsenyev in an essay called "The Writers of Our Times" (Vestnik Evropy, No.12, 1887) included "Misery" into his list of the best contemporary short stories. Leo Tolstoy included "Misery" into his personal list of Chekhov's best stories.

References

External links
 Тоска. Original Russian text

Short stories by Anton Chekhov
1886 short stories
Works originally published in Russian newspapers